Michael Golden is an American comics artist and writer best known for his late-1970s work on Marvel Comics' The Micronauts and The 'Nam, as well as his co-creation of the characters Rogue and Bucky O'Hare.

His work is known to have influenced the style of artist Arthur Adams.

Career
After starting his illustration career in commercial art, Golden entered the comics industry in late 1977, working on such DC Comics titles as Mister Miracle and Batman Family. His first work for Marvel Comics was "The Cask of Amontillado", a backup story in Marvel Classics Comics #28 (1977) adapting an Edgar Allan Poe short story. In 1978, he collaborated with Bill Mantlo on Marvel's Micronauts which he illustrated for the series' first 12 issues. He drew a number of Marvel series throughout the 1970s and 1980s, including Doctor Strange, the Howard the Duck black-and-white comics magazine, and Marvel Fanfare. Writer Chris Claremont co-created Rogue with Golden in The Avengers Annual #10 (1981). At Continuity Comics, Golden and writer Larry Hama introduced Bucky O'Hare in Echo of Futurepast #1 (May 1984). Back at Marvel, The 'Nam series was launched in 1986 by Doug Murray and Golden. Golden drew covers for the licensed series G.I. Joe: A Real American Hero, Rom, U.S. 1, and The Saga of Crystar. Golden also penciled parts of the Marvel No-Prize Book . In the early 1990s, Golden was an editor for DC Comics and later in the decade served as Senior Art Director for Marvel Comics. In the 2000s, he drew covers for DC Comics' Nightwing, Superman: The Man of Steel, and Vigilante. Despite his considerable amount of work in comics, Golden has stated that he still finds advertising and commercial design work to be more fulfilling than comics, because "it's something different each time."

Golden's art style later inspired a number of later comics creators, including Arthur Adams. Golden's work was also appropriated by Glenn Danzig as a logo for his bands Samhain and Danzig. He is managed by Renée Witterstaetter (a former comics colorist, writer, and editor) of Eva Ink Publishing.

In a 1997 interview with Wizard magazine, Golden explained that he had not attended a comics convention since 1979, because he is uncomfortable with the cult of personality treatment of comics creators. By the 2000s, however, he had been known to make appearances at conventions.

Bibliography

Interior art

Continuity
 Bucky O'Hare #1–2, 4–5 (1991–92)
 Echo of Futurepast (Bucky O'Hare) #1–6 (1984–85)

DC Comics

 Batman #295  ("Unsolved Cases of The Batman") #303 (1978)
 Batman Special #1 (1984)
 Batman Family (Man-Bat) #15–17; (Batman) #18–20 (1978)
 Batman: Legends of the Dark Knight Annual #1 (1991)
 Batman: Odyssey #1 (2010)
 Batman: Odyssey vol. 2 #1–2 (2011–2012)
 Birds of Prey #66 (2004)
 DC Special Series (Batman) #15 (1978)
 Deathstroke, The Terminator #12 (1992)
 Detective Comics (The Demon and Bat-Mite stories) #482 (1979)
 Ghosts #67, 88 (1978–1980)
 House of Mystery #257, 259, 266 (1978–1979)
 House of Secrets (Abel) #148–149 (one page each), #151 (1977–1978)
 Justice League Europe Annual #2 (four-pages inks over John Beatty, among other artists) (1991)
 Mister Miracle #23–25 (1978)
 Mystery in Space #113 (1980)
 Secrets of Haunted House #10 (1978)
 Superman: The Man of Steel Gallery #1 (pin-up) (1995)
 Who's Who in the DC Universe (Man-Bat profile) #12; (Blackfire profile) #13 (two pages each) (1991)

Marvel Comics

 The Avengers Annual #10 (1981)
 Bizarre Adventures #25, 28 (1981)
 Daredevil vol. 2 #65 (five pages, among other artists) (2004)
 Defenders #53–54 (among other artists) (1977)
 Doctor Strange #46, 55 (1981–1982)
 Epic Illustrated #3–4, 32 (1980–1985)
 Fantastic Four Roast #1 (two pages, among other artists) (1982)
 G.I. Joe Yearbook #2 (1986)
 Howard the Duck (black-and-white magazine) #1, 5–6 (1979–1980)
 Marvel Classics Comics #28 (1977)
 Marvel Fanfare #1–2, 4, 45, 47 (1982–1989)
 Marvel Holiday Special (Wolverine) (1992)
 Marvel: Shadows and Light (Doctor Strange) #1 (1997)
 Micronauts #1–12 (1979)
 Mutant X #12 (one pinup) (1999)
 The 'Nam #1–11, 13 (1986–1987)
 Official Handbook of the Marvel Universe #10 (1983)
 Official Handbook of the Marvel Universe Deluxe Edition #12 (1986)
 Savage Tales vol. 2 #1, 4 (five pages) (1985–1986)
 Star-Lord, The Special Edition #1 (framing sequence) (1982)
 Star Wars #38 (1980)
 Uncanny X-Men #273, Annual #7 (1983–1991)

Other publishers
 Toyboy #7 (1989) (Continuity Comics)
 Jackie Chan's Spartan X: Hell-Bent-Hero-For-Hire #3 (1998) (Image Comics)
 Jackie Chan's Spartan X: The Armour of Heaven #1-3 (1997) (Topps Comics)

Covers

DC Comics

Adventures of Superman #590 
Batman #484–485 
Batman: Cyber Revolution #1–2 
Detective Comics #625, 626, 628–631, 633, 644–646  
Nightwing #66–77 
Ocean #1–6 (WildStorm)
Robo Dojo #1–6 (WildStorm)
Showcase 93 #4 (1993)
Superman: The Man of Steel #127–128 
Vigilante #1–4

Marvel Comics

Alpha Flight #84 
Doctor Strange #42, 43, 44, 55  
Fantastic Four: World's Greatest Comic Magazine #2 
G.I. Joe: A Real American Hero #23, 27, 29, 36, 116-118  
G.I. Joe Yearbook #1, 2  
Marvel No-Prize Book #1  
Micronauts #13–24, 38, 39, 59 
Mutant X #24–31 
New Exiles #1–3 
Nomad vol. 2 #19, 22–25
Peter Parker: Spider-Man, vol. 2, Annual 2001 
The Punisher vol. 2 #50–51, 53, 58, 86–87, Annual #4 
Punisher Armory #9–10 
The Punisher War Journal #25–30, 40, 61–64  
The Punisher War Zone #17–19, 23–25, Annual #1  
Rom #7–11, 19  
Savage She-Hulk #8–11  
Savage Sword of Conan #98, 101, 105–106, 117, 124, 150  
Savage Tales vol. 2, #1  
The 'Nam #1-13, 39, 42, 66, 79-81
Transformers #2

Other publishers
G.I. Joe: America's Elite #36 (Devil's Due Publishing)
Out of the Vortex #8 (Dark Horse Comics)
Team 7: Dead Reckoning #1–4 (Image Comics)
Union #8–10 (Image Comics)
The X-Men companion #1 (Fantagraphics Books)

Portfolios and art books
Doctor Strange (Marvel)
Michael Golden's Jurassic Park Portfolio One (Image/Eva Ink)
Michael Golden's Jurassic Park Portfolio Two (Image/Eva Ink)
Michael Golden's Monsters (Image/Eva Ink 2006)
Excess: The Art of Michael Golden (Vanguard)
Manga Bucky O'Hare (Vanguard)
In the Studio with Michael Golden (TwoMorrows)
Michael Golden: Heroes and Villains (Eva Ink)
Michael Golden: MORE Heroes and Villains (Eva Ink)
Michael Golden: Alchemy (Eva Ink)

Notes

References

External links

Michael Golden at Mike's Amazing World of Comics
Michael Golden at the Unofficial Handbook of Marvel Comics Creators
Michael Golden interview at the Metrópoli Comic Con 2017 

Year of birth missing (living people)
20th-century American artists
21st-century American artists
American comics artists
Comic book editors
DC Comics people
Living people
Marvel Comics people